The Archipini are a tribe of tortrix moths. Since many genera of these are not yet assigned to tribes, the genus list presented here is provisional.

Diversity
Archipini is the largest tribe in the Tortricinae subfamily, containing over 1,600 described species in about 150 genera.

Distribution
Archipini are found in all ecoregions, although there are only few species in the Neotropical realm.

Biology
Many of the economically important pests among the tortrix moths belong to this tribe, for example the Light brown apple moth and the spruce budworms. The larvae are often polyphagous.

Genera

Abrepagoge
Acroceuthes
Acropolitis
Adoxophyes
Allodemis
Ancyroclepsis
Aneuxanthis
Anisotenes
Anthophrys
Antiphrastis
Aoupinieta
Aphelia
Aphthonocosma
Archepandemis
Archidemis
Archips
Argyrotaenia
Aristocosma
Arizelana
Ascerodes
Asteriognatha
Atelodora
Authomaema
Avaria
Bactrostoma
Balioxena
Battalia
Borboniella
Borneogena
Brachyvalva
Cacoecimorpha
Callibryastis
Capua
Carphomigma
Catamacta
Ceramea
Ceritaenia
Chamaepsichia
Chionothremma
Chiraps
Chirapsina
Choanograptis
Choristoneura
Claduncaria
Clepsis
Coeloptera
Cornips
Cornuclepsis
Cornusaccula
Cosmiophrys
Cryptomelaena
Cryptoptila
Ctenopseustis
Cudonigera
Cununcus
Cuspidata
Daemilus
Dentisociaria
Diactora
Dicanticinta
Dicellitis
Dichelia
Dichelopa
Diedra
Digitosa
Diplocalyptis
Ditula
Droceta
Durangarchips
Dynatocephala
Ecclitica
Egogepa
Electraglaia
Epagoge
Epalxiphora
Epichorista
Epichoristodes
Epiphyas
Ericodesma
Eurythecta
Exorstaenia
Farragona
Furcataenia
Furcinula
Gelophaula
Geogepa
Gephyraspis
Glyphidoptera
Gnorismoneura
Gongylotypa
Goniotorna
Harmologa
Hectaphelia
Heterochorista
Hiceteria
Homona
Homonoides
Homonopsis
Idolatteria
Isochorista
Isodemis
Isotenes
Josefrazowskia
Kanikehia
Labidosa
Leontochroma
Leptochroptila
Leucotenes
Lozotaenia
Lozotaeniodes
Lumaria
Mantua
Meridemis
Merophyas
Mersa
Mesocalyptis
Metamesia
Mictopsichia
Midaellobes
Minutargyrotoza
Neocalyptis
Nexosa
Niphothixa
Nkandla
Notioclepsis
Nuritamburia
Ochetarcha
Ochrotaenia
Orilesa
Panaphelix
Pandemis
Paradichelia
Paramesia
Paramesiodes
Paraphasis
Pararrhaptica
Periclepsis
Peteliacma
Petridia
Phaenacropista
Phalarotortrix
Philedone
Philedonides
Philocryptica
Phlebozemia
Planostocha
Planotortrix
Platyhomonopsis
Platysemaphora
Procalyptis
Procrica
Pseudeulia
Pteridoporthis
Pternozyga
Ptycholoma
Ptycholomoides
Pyrgotis
Pyrsarcha
Raisapoana
Rubropsichia
Saetotaenia
Scotiophyes
Snodgrassia
Sorensenata
Spheterista
Spinotaenia
Sychnochlaena
Sychnovalva
Syndemis
Synochoneura
Tacertaenia
Terricula
Terthreutis
Thrincophora
Tosirips
Tremophora
Tuckia
Ulodemis
Vialonga
Viettea
Williella
Xenophylla
Xenotemna
Xenothictis
Zacorisca

Unplaced species
Anisogona placoxantha Lower, 1896
Archips socotranus Walsingham, 1900
Argyrotoxa pompica Turner, 1925
Arotrophora chionaula Meyrick, 1910
Arotrophora cosmoplaca Lower, 1903
Cacoecia clivigera Meyrick, 1932
Cacoecia desmotana Meyrick, 1881
Cacoecia mansueta Meyrick, 1923
Cacoecia mnemosynana Meyrick, 1881
Cacoecia ophiodesma Lower, 1902
Cacoecia recurvana Zeller, 1866
Cacoecia tessulatana Meyrick, 1881
Capua acrita Turner, 1916
Capua adynata Turner, 1945
Capua arrosta Turner, 1945
Capua arrythmodes Turner, 1946
Capua asemantica Turner, 1927
Capua belophora Turner, 1945
Capua castanitis Turner, 1925
Capua catharia Turner, 1926
Capua ceramica Lower, 1908
Capua cnaphalodes Meyrick, 1910
Capua confragosa Meyrick, 1922
Capua deuterastis Meyrick, 1910
Capua dryina Meyrick, 1910
Capua effulgens Meyrick, 1910
Capua ephedra Meyrick, 1910
Capua eugrapta Turner, 1927
Capua euryochra Turner, 1914
Capua gongylia Turner, 1925
Capua hedyma Turner, 1915
Capua hemicosmana Meyrick, 1881
Capua ischnomorpha Turner, 1945
Capua leptospila Lower, 1901
Capua leucobela Turner, 1945
Capua leucospila Lower, 1893
Capua leucostacta Meyrick, 1910
Capua montanana Meyrick, 1881
Capua multistriata Turner, 1945
Capua naias Turner, 1916
Capua notograpta Meyrick, 1910
Capua notopasta Turner, 1945
Capua nummulata Meyrick, 1910
Capua ophthalmias Meyrick, 1910
Capua oxygona Lower, 1899
Capua paraloxa Meyrick, 1910
Capua parastactis Meyrick, 1910
Capua phaeosema Turner, 1945
Capua phellodes Meyrick, 1910
Capua phryctora Meyrick, 1910
Capua poliobaphes Turner, 1926
Capua ptilocrossa Meyrick, 1914
Capua pylora Meyrick, 1938
Capua scaphosema Turner, 1945
Capua tapinopis Turner, 1945
Capua tarachota Meyrick, 1910
Capua tetraplasia Turner, 1916
Capua thiodyta Meyrick, 1931
Capua triadelpha Meyrick, 1920
Cnephasia argyrocosma Turner, 1925
Cnephasia bleptodora Turner, 1925
Cnephasia catarrapha Turner, 1945
Cnephasia contortula Turner, 1927
Cnephasia crotala Meyrick, 1910
Cnephasia lenaea Meyrick, 1910
Cnephasia mermera Meyrick, 1910
Cnephasia orthias Meyrick, 1910
Cnephasia phosphora Meyrick, 1910
Cnephasia stereodes Meyrick, 1910
Cnephasia thiopasta Turner, 1915
Conchylis amoenana Walker, 1863
Conchylis tasmaniana Walker, 1863
Crambus humerellus Walker, 1866
Dichelia atristrigana Meyrick, 1881
Dichelia clarana Meyrick, 1881
Dichelia cosmopis Lower, 1894
Dichelia hyperetana Meyrick, 1881
Dichelia sobriana Walker, 1863
Dichelia thermaterimma Lower, 1893
Dipterina gnophodryas Lower, 1902
Dipterina refluana Meyrick, 1881
Dipterina rupicolana Meyrick, 1881
Dipterina tribolana Meyrick, 1881
Epichorista serena Meyrick, 1910
Homona biscutata Meyrick, 1931
Isochorista cerophanes Meyrick, 1910
Proselena camacinana Meyrick, 1882
Teras jamaicana Walker, 1863
Teras mersana Walker, 1863
Tortrix agroeca Meyrick, 1908
Tortrix agrypna Meyrick, 1910
Tortrix alysidina Turner, 1927
Tortrix arcaria Meyrick, 1910
Tortrix campylosema Turner, 1945
Tortrix campylosticha Turner, 1939
Tortrix cataractis Meyrick, 1910
Tortrix celatrix Turner, 1916
Tortrix chalicodes Meyrick, 1920
Tortrix concolorana Meyrick, 1881
Tortrix constrictana Walker, 1866
Tortrix cratista Walsingham, 1914
Tortrix diametrica Meyrick, 1932
Tortrix dinota Meyrick, 1918
Tortrix entherma Meyrick, 1914
Tortrix eusticha Turner, 1945
Tortrix furtiva Meyrick, 1911
Tortrix haplopolia Turner, 1939
Tortrix hilarantha Meyrick, 1918
Tortrix hilarantha Meyrick, 1918
Tortrix hilarantha Meyrick, 1918
Tortrix hilarantha Meyrick, 1918
Tortrix hydractis Meyrick, 1910
Tortrix hyperptycha Meyrick, in Caradja, 1931
Tortrix incompta Turner, 1927
Tortrix liquefacta Meyrick, 1908
Tortrix olgana Kennel, 1919
Tortrix oressinoma Turner, 1925
Tortrix oriarcha Meyrick, 1910
Tortrix parana Busck, 1911
Tortrix phaeoneura Turner, 1945
Tortrix plagiomochla Turner, 1945
Tortrix polymicta Turner, 1927
Tortrix polyphrica Turner, 1927
Tortrix procapna Turner, 1945
Tortrix rhodochropa Meyrick, 1927
Tortrix scaeodoxa Meyrick, 1935
Tortrix spilographa Meyrick, 1937
Tortrix standishana Newman, 1856
Tortrix stigmatias Meyrick, 1910
Tortrix technica Turner, 1939
Tortrix technitis Meyrick, 1910
Tortrix telephanta Meyrick, 1910
Tortrix tephrodes Turner, 1916

Selected former genera
Bradleyella
Doridostoma
Hypsidracon
Xeneda

References

 , 2005: World catalogue of insects volume 5 Tortricidae.
 , 2013: Phylogeny of the tribe Archipini (Lepidoptera: Tortricidae: Tortricinae) and evolutionary correlates of novel secondary sexual structures. Zootaxa, 3729(1): 1-62.
 , 1922 (Archipsidii). Genitalia Group Tortricidae Lepid. Br. Is.: XXI, 1.
  1990: Reassessment of Ctenopseustis Meyrick and Planotortrix Dugdale with descriptions of two new genera (Lepidoptera: Tortricidae). New Zealand journal of zoology, 17: 437-465.
 , 2000. Phylogeny of the tribe Archipini of Japan: Cladistic approach. TMU Bulletin of Natural History 4: 33-75.
 , 1982: Notes on Chinese Ulodemis Meyrick (Lepidoptera: Tortricidae) with description of a new species. Acta Entomologica Sinica 25 (2): 204-205.
 , 1982: Notes on Chinese Pandemis Hübner (Lepidoptera: Tortricidae), with descriptions of two new species. Acta Zootaxonomica Sinica 7 (2): 196-202.
 , 2009: Revision of Mictopsichia Hübner with descriptions of new species and two new genera (Lepidoptera: Tortricidae). Polish Journal of Entomology 78 (3): 223-252. Full article: 
 , 2012: Five tortricines from Malaysia and New Caledonia (Lepidoptera: Tortricidae). Polish Journal of Entomology 81 (1): 81-90. Full article: .
 , 2013: Leaf-rollers from New Caledonia (Lepidoptera: Tortricidae). Shilap Revista de Lepidopterologia 41 (161): 69-93.
 , 2000: Description of nine Neotropical genera of Archipini (Lepidoptera, Tortricidae) and their species. Acta Zoologica Cracoviensia 43 (3-4): 199-216.
 , 2000: Revision of the Neotropical Argyrotaenia Stephens, with notes on Diedra Rubinoff & Powell (Lepidoptera: Tortricidae). Acta Zoologica Cracoviensia 43 (3-4): 307-332.
 , 2010: Systematic and distributional data on Neotropical Archipini (Lepidoptera: Tortricidae). Acta Zoologica Cracoviensia 53B (1-2): 9-38. DOI: 10.3409/azc.53b_1-2.09-38. Full article:  .
 , 2009: Records of Tortricidae from the Afrotropical Region, with descriptions of new taxa (Lepidoptera: Tortricidae). Shilap Revista de Entomologia 37 (147): 371-384.
  2010: An annotated catalogue of the types of Tortricidae (Lepidoptera) in the collection of the Royal Museum for Central Africa (Tervuren, Belgium) with descriptions of new genera and new species. Zootaxa 2469: 1-77. Abstract: .
 , 2010:  Tortricidae (Lepidoptera) from Ethiopia Journal of Entomological and Acarological Research Serie II, 42 (2): 47-79. Abstract: .
 , 2008: Tortricidae (Lepidoptera) from the mountains of Ecuador. Part 1: Southern Highlands. Acta Zoologica Cracoviensia 51B (1-2): 7-41

External links
 Markku Savela's Lepidoptera and some other life forms: Preliminary genus list. Version of 2005-SEP-14. Retrieved 2007-MAY-29.
 Bugguide.net. Tribe Archipini

 
Moth tribes